Mid Somerset was a parliamentary constituency in the county of Somerset, which returned two Members of Parliament (MPs) to the House of Commons of the Parliament of the United Kingdom, elected by the bloc vote system.

It was created for the 1868 general election,  and abolished for the 1885 general election, when Somerset was divided into several new single-member constituencies: Bridgwater, Frome, East Somerset, North Somerset, South Somerset, Wellington and Wells.

Members of Parliament

Election results

Elections in the 1860s

Elections in the 1870s

Neville-Grenville resigned, causing a by-election.

Elections in the 1880s

Gore-Langton resigned, causing a by-election.

References 

Parliamentary constituencies in Somerset (historic)
Constituencies of the Parliament of the United Kingdom established in 1868
Constituencies of the Parliament of the United Kingdom disestablished in 1885